Fallon Fox (born November 29, 1975) is an American former mixed martial artist (MMA), and the first MMA fighter who is openly transgender.

Early life
Fox was born in Toledo, Ohio. She recalls struggling with her gender as early as age five or six. As a teenager, Fox believed she may have been a gay man, but learned the term "transgender" at the age of 17. Fox continued living as a heterosexual man and married her then-girlfriend at the age of 19, when the latter became pregnant with their daughter. Fox then joined the US Navy to support her new family and served as an operations specialist on the USS Enterprise.

After leaving the Navy, Fox enrolled at the University of Toledo, but dropped out after ongoing psychological stress from her unresolved gender issues.

After leaving college, Fox worked as a truck driver in order to afford  sex reassignment surgery. Fox and her daughter moved to Chicago, Illinois and in 2006, Fox traveled to Bangkok, Thailand, to undergo feminizing gender reassignment surgery, breast augmentation, and hair transplant surgeries at a hospital in Bangkok.

Mixed martial arts career controversy

Fallon Fox came out as transgender on March 5, 2013, during an interview with Outsports writer Cyd Zeigler and Sports Illustrated, following her two initial professional fights in the women's division. Controversy swelled over confusion with the California State Athletic Commission (CSAC) and Florida's athletic commission over the licensing process Fox chose to complete in Coral Gables. After publications shed light on the licensing procedure and Fox's coming out many commentators brought up the issue of whether a woman who was assigned male at birth should be able to fight in women's divisions in MMA fighting.

UFC color commentator and stand-up comedian Joe Rogan opposed Fallon Fox receiving licensing, saying,First of all, she's not really a she. She's a transgender, post-op person. The operation doesn't shave down your bone density. It doesn't change. You look at a man's hands and you look at a woman's hands and they're built different. They're just thicker, they're stronger, your wrists are thicker, your elbows are thicker, your joints are thicker. Just the mechanical function of punching, a man can do it much harder than a woman can, period.Due to controversy and the licensing procedure CFA co-founder Jorge De La Noval, who promoted Fox's fight on March 2 in Florida, postponed Fox's April 20 fight. However, De La Noval later stated his organization will not  "turn our backs on her ... As long as she's licensed, she's always welcome in our promotion. We stand behind her and we give her all of our support." Fox claimed in her video interview with Cyd Zeigler to be within the rules of organizations like the International Olympic Committee (IOC) for postoperative transsexuals and wishes to continue fighting in MMA.

On April 8, 2013, Matt Mitrione, in an appearance on The MMA Hour, said that Fox was "still a man", and called Fox an "embarrassment" and a "lying, sick, sociopathic, disgusting freak". UFC "was appalled by the transphobic comments" he made, and, referring to itself as "a friend and ally of the LGBT community", immediately suspended Mitrione, and fined him an undisclosed amount. The next day Fox issued a response stating that Mitrione "personally attacked me as a fighter, as a woman, and as a human being".

Whether or not Fox possesses an advantage over cisgender female fighters was a topic on the April 2014 edition of HBO's Real Sports with Bryant Gumbel.

In an interview with the New York Post, former UFC women's bantamweight champion Ronda Rousey stated she would be willing to fight Fox, saying "I can knock out anyone in the world", although she believes Fox has male bone density and structure, leading to an unfair advantage. In an interview with Out, Rousey said: "I feel like if you go through puberty as a 'man' it's not something you can reverse. ... There's no undo button on that." UFC president Dana White claimed that "bone structure is different, hands are bigger, jaw is bigger, everything is bigger" and said "I don't think someone who used to be a man and became a woman should be able to fight a woman."

During Fox's fight against Tamikka Brents on September 13, 2014, Brents suffered a concussion, an orbital bone fracture, and seven staples to the head in the 1st round. After her loss, Brents took to social media to convey her thoughts on the experience of fighting Fox: "I've fought a lot of women and have never felt the strength that I felt in a fight as I did that night. I can't answer whether it's because she was born a man or not because I'm not a doctor. I can only say, I've never felt so overpowered ever in my life and I am an abnormally strong female in my own right," she stated. "Her grip was different, I could usually move around in the clinch against other females but couldn't move at all in Fox's clinch ...".

Eric Vilain, the director of the Institute For Society And Genetics at UCLA, worked with the Association of Boxing Commissions when they wrote their policy on transgender athletes. He stated in Time magazine that "Male to female transsexuals have significantly less muscle strength and bone density, and higher fat mass, than males" and said that, to be licensed, transgender female fighters must undergo complete "surgical anatomical changes ..., including external genitalia and gonadectomy" and subsequently a minimum of two years of hormone replacement therapy, administered by a board certified specialist. In general concurrence with peer-reviewed scientific literature, he states this to be "the current understanding of the minimum amount of time necessary to obviate male hormone gender related advantages in sports competition". Vilain reviewed Fox's medical records and said she has "clearly fulfilled all conditions." When asked if Fox could, nonetheless, be stronger than her competitors, Vilain replied that it was possible, but noted that "sports is made up of competitors who, by definition, have advantages for all kinds of genetics  reasons". Fox herself responded to the controversy with an analogy comparing herself to Jackie Robinson in a guest editorial for a UFC and MMA news website:

The documentary Game Face provides an inside look into Fox's life during the beginning of her MMA controversy.

In July 2022, the BBC apologised for interviewing Fox on the BBC Radio 4 Today programme. The BBC had been criticised for not informing listeners that Fox had taken pride in violence against women. A tweet from Fox in 2020 said: "For the record, I knocked two out. One woman’s skull was fractured, the other not. And just so you know, I enjoyed it. See, I love smacking up TEFS (sic) in the cage who talk transphobic nonsense. It’s bliss!" In response to the BBC, Fox said: "It’s part of MMA culture to talk smack about opponents. You see it all the time. Only when I do it people take issue with it."

Personal life
Fox was raised Christian but has since become an atheist.

Mixed martial arts record

|-
|Win
|align=center|5–1 
| Tamikka Brents
| TKO (punches) 
| CCCW: The Undertaking
| 
|align=center| 1 
|align=center| 2:17
| Springfield, Illinois, United States
|
|-
|Win
|align=center|4–1 
| Heather Bassett
| Submission (armbar) 
| Xtreme Fighting Organization 50
| 
|align=center| 2 
|align=center| 0:44
| Chicago, Illinois, United States
|
|-
|Loss
|align=center|3–1 
| Ashlee Evans-Smith
| TKO (punches) 
| CFA 12
| 
|align=center| 3 
|align=center| 4:15
| Coral Gables, Florida, United States
| 
|-
| Win
|align=center| 3–0
| Allanna Jones
| Submission (shin choke)
| CFA 11: Kyle vs. Wiuff 2
| 
|align=center| 3
|align=center| 3:36
| Coral Gables, Florida, United States
| 
|-
| Win
|align=center| 2–0
| Ericka Newsome
| KO (knee)
| CFA 10: McSweeney vs. Staring
| 
|align=center| 1
|align=center| 0:39
| Coral Gables, Florida, United States
| 
|-
| Win
|align=center| 1–0
| Elisha Helsper
| TKO (injury)
| KOTC Wild Card
| 
|align=center| 1
|align=center| 2:00
| Worley, Idaho, United States
| 
|-

|-
|Win
|align=center|1–0
|Rickie Gomes
|Submission (armbar)
| Rocktown Showdown 12
|
|align=center|1
|align=center|2:27
|Rockford, Illinois, United States
|

Awards
In 2014, Fox was inducted into the National Gay and Lesbian Sports Hall of Fame.

See also
Patricio Manuel, the first transgender professional boxer in the United States
Parinya Charoenphol, Thai boxer and kathoey

References

External links

1975 births
African-American sportswomen
African-American mixed martial artists
Transgender sportswomen
LGBT mixed martial artists
Transgender women
Transgender military personnel
Sportspeople from Toledo, Ohio
United States Navy sailors
Sportspeople from Chicago
LGBT African Americans
LGBT people from Illinois
LGBT people from Ohio
American LGBT sportspeople
LGBT-related controversies in sports
Living people
American female mixed martial artists
American LGBT military personnel
Female United States Navy personnel
Featherweight mixed martial artists
21st-century African-American sportspeople
21st-century African-American women
20th-century African-American sportspeople
20th-century African-American women
20th-century African-American people
Combat sports controversies
African-American United States Navy personnel
African-American atheists
Inductees of the National Gay and Lesbian Sports Hall of Fame